Višnje is a village south of Ambrus in the Municipality of Ivančna Gorica in central Slovenia. The area is part of the historical region of Lower Carniola. The municipality is now included in the Central Slovenia Statistical Region. 

The local church is dedicated to Saints Phillip and James and belongs to the Parish of Ambrus. It was first mentioned in written documents dating to 1136, but burned down in 1943. It was rebuilt in 1968.

References

External links
Višnje on Geopedia

Populated places in the Municipality of Ivančna Gorica